William Robertson Gray, Jr. (December 27, 1922 – August 18, 2011) was an American football offensive lineman in the National Football League for the Washington Redskins.  He played college football at the University of Southern California and Oregon State University and was drafted in the seventh round of the 1947 NFL Draft.

References

1922 births
2011 deaths
American football offensive guards
Oregon State Beavers football players
USC Trojans football players
Washington Redskins players
Players of American football from Portland, Oregon